The Dawson River is a river located in Central Queensland, Australia.

Course and features
The Dawson River rises in the Carnarvon Range, draining through the Carnarvon National Park, northwest of the settlement of Upper Dawson. The flows generally south by east, crossed by the Carnarvon Highway and then flows generally east through the settlement of  where the river is crossed by the Leichhardt Highway. The river then flows in a northerly direction through the settlement of  where the river is again crossed by the Leichhardt Highway. A little further north, the Dawson River forms confluence with the Mackenzie River to form the Fitzroy River. From source to mouth, the river is joined by sixty-four tributaries, including the Don River, and descends  over its  course. Several weirs have been constructed along the river to provide water for cotton and dairy farming in the region.

Expedition National Park and the Precipice National Park are protected areas along the Dawson River.

The Dawson River was one of a number of Queensland rivers affected by the 2010–11 Queensland floods. As the river inundated the town of Theodore it was completely evacuated, a first in Queensland's history.

History
Gungabula (also known as Kongabula and Khungabula) is an Australian Aboriginal language of the headwaters of the Dawson River in Central Queensland. The language region includes areas within the local government area of Maranoa Region, particularly the towns of Charleville, Augathella and Blackall and as well as the Carnarvon Range.

Ludwig Leichhardt explored the area in 1844 and named the river in honour of Robert Dawson, one of Leichhardt's financial backers.

In the 1920s, shortly after the First World War, Australian Labor Party politician Ted Theodore (1884-1950) launched an irrigation program on the Dawson River for returning soldiers. His intentions was to provide them with arable land along the river for them to take up farming, thus eschewing a post-war recession. After the 1922 Irrigation Act was passed, he started irrigation schemes on the Dawson River, for an initial 8,000 new farmers. However, the scheme was abandoned after he realized the soil was unsuitable for farming and the returning soldiers had no agrarian skills.

See also

Boggomoss

References

Rivers of Queensland
Floods in Queensland
Central Queensland